State Trunk Highway 154 (often called Highway 154, STH-154 or WIS 154) is a state highway in the U.S. state of Wisconsin. It runs in east–west in south-central Wisconsin from near Loyd to Rock Springs.

Route description
The highway begins at its intersection with Wisconsin Highway 58 north of the community of Neptune and follows a northeasterly path from it. After a short concurrency with County Highway G, it passes through Hill Point and continues east until it reaches Loganville. In Loganville, the highway becomes concurrent with Highway 23 and heads northwards. After 3.5 miles, the concurrency ends and the highway heads eastwards, passing through Wiedman Memorial Park and intersections with county highways CH and D before terminating in Rock Springs at its intersection with Highway 136 and County Highway DD.

Major intersections

See also

References

External links

154
Transportation in Richland County, Wisconsin
Transportation in Sauk County, Wisconsin